The Chehalis River
is a river in Washington in the United States. It originates in several forks in southwestern Washington, flows east, then north, then west, in a large curve, before emptying into Grays Harbor, an estuary of the Pacific Ocean.

It was once much larger during the Ice Age when the tongue of the glacial ice sheet covering the Puget Sound terminated near Olympia and glacial runoff formed a large torrent of meltwater. This carved a large oversized valley that is much larger than the current river could have produced. The river's mouth was out near current Westport until rising sea levels at the end of the ice age flooded the broad Chehalis Valley to form a ria, known today as Grays Harbor.

Course

The Chehalis River begins at the confluence of the West Fork Chehalis River and East Fork Chehalis River, in southwestern Lewis County. From there the Chehalis flows north and east, collecting tributary streams that drain the Willapa Hills and other low mountains of southwestern Washington. The South Fork Chehalis River joins the main river a few miles west of the city of Chehalis. The Newaukum River joins the Chehalis River at Chehalis, after which the river turns north, flowing by the city of Centralia, where the Skookumchuck River joins. After Centralia, the Chehalis River flows north and west, collecting tributaries such as the Black River, which drains the Black Hills to the north, then in the Chehalis Gap collects the Satsop River and Wynoochee River, which drain the southern part of the Olympic Mountains.

The Wynoochee River joins the Chehalis near Montesano, after which the Chehalis River becomes increasingly affected by tides and widens into Grays Harbor estuary. The city of Aberdeen lies at the mouth of the Chehalis River. Just east of Aberdeen, the Wishkah River joins the Chehalis, and just west, between Aberdeen and Hoquiam, the Hoquiam River joins. At this point the river has become Grays Harbor. Before the estuary of Grays Harbor empties into the Pacific Ocean, the Humptulips River joins.

Flood history

December 3, 2007, floods
The recommended detour added about four hours and 280 miles (450 km). It was not expected to reopen for several days.
However, upon breaching a dike on Dec. 5, 2007, the water receded more quickly than anticipated.    Amtrak train service between Portland, Oregon, and Vancouver, British Columbia, was also disrupted. Washington governor Christine Gregoire declared a state of emergency on December 3.

January 7, 2009, floods
During the January 7, 2009, Pacific Northwest storms, a  stretch of Interstate 5 was closed between exits 68 and 88 because of flooding from the Chehalis River, causing the roadway to be under several feet of water. Since the main east–west mountain passes were also closed during this event, the flooding from the Chehalis River essentially cut off interstate traffic to the Puget Sound area from the south, and no detour was available.

See also
List of Washington rivers

References

External links
 Chehalis River Council
 USGS Chehalis River Basin map
 USGS Chehalis River Basin schematic diagram
 , USGS, GNIS
 , USGS, GNIS
 , USGS, GNIS
 Interstate 5 near Chehalis shut down indefinitely

Rivers of Washington (state)
Rivers of Grays Harbor County, Washington
Rivers of Thurston County, Washington
Rivers of Lewis County, Washington